Donald M. Berwick (born September 9, 1946) is a former Administrator of the Centers for Medicare and Medicaid Services (CMS). Prior to his work in the administration, he was President and Chief Executive Officer of the Institute for Healthcare Improvement a not-for-profit organization.

On July 7, 2010, President Barack Obama appointed Berwick to serve as the Administrator of CMS through a recess appointment. On December 2, 2011, he resigned because of heavy Republican opposition to his appointment and his potential inability to win a confirmation vote.  On June 18, 2013, Berwick declared his candidacy for governor of Massachusetts, but lost the Democratic Party nomination to Attorney General Martha Coakley.

Berwick has studied the management of health care systems, with emphasis on using scientific methods and evidence-based medicine and comparative effectiveness research to improve the tradeoff among quality, safety, and costs.

Among IHI's projects are online courses for health care professionals for reducing Clostridium difficile infections, lowering the number of heart failure readmissions or managing advanced disease and palliative care. In March 2012 he joined the Center for American Progress as a Senior Fellow.

Biography
Berwick grew up in Moodus, Connecticut. His father, Philip, worked as the town's family doctor. His mother, Rosalind Fine, was the primary caretaker of Berwick and his two younger brothers until she died from ovarian cancer in 1961. Because of Fine's efforts to promote the construction of a new elementary school in Moodus, the school's library was named after her when it was built.

Berwick said that he was motivated by his Jewish upbringing. “The ethical foundations of Judaism speak to me about being proper stewards of society and the world,” said Berwick. “It affects my views and reminds us all we are in this together and really have to help each other,” he said. “I’m worried about the failure to realize progressive issues I care about: healthcare as a human right, poverty and justice. These issues are under siege in America.”

Berwick graduated from Nathan Hale-Ray High School and went on to obtain his A.B. from Harvard College, where he graduated summa cum laude. While at Harvard, Berwick met his future wife, Ann, in his freshman biology class, where they were lab partners. The couple have four children: Ben, Dan, Jessica, and Becca. Berwick earned both an M.D. cum laude from Harvard Medical School and an M.P.P. from John F. Kennedy School of Government in 1972. He completed his medical residency in pediatrics at Children's Hospital Boston.

Berwick began his career as a pediatrician at Harvard Community Health Plan; in 1983 he became the plan's first Vice President of Quality-of-Care Measurement. In that position, Berwick investigated quality control measures in other industries such as aeronautics and manufacturing, in order to consider their application in health care settings. From 1987 to 1991, Berwick was co-founder and Co-Principal Investigator for the National Demonstration Project on Quality Improvement in Health Care, designed to explore opportunities for quality improvement in health care. Based on this work, Berwick left Harvard Community Health Plan in 1989 and co-founded the IHI (Institute for Healthcare Improvement).

Berwick is Clinical Professor of Pediatrics and Health Care Policy in the Department of Pediatrics at the Harvard Medical School and Professor of Health Policy and Management at the Harvard School of Public Health. He is also a pediatrician, Adjunct Staff in the Department of Medicine at Children's Hospital Boston, and a Consultant in Pediatrics at Massachusetts General Hospital.

Berwick has published over 129 articles in professional journals on health care policy, decision analysis, technology assessment, and health care quality management. He is the co-author of several books, including Cholesterol, Children, and Heart Disease: an Analysis of Alternatives (1980), Curing Health Care (1990), and New Rules: Regulation, Markets and the Quality of American Health Care (1996). In February 2013, he participated as a speaker on Voices in Leadership, an original Harvard T.H. Chan School of Public Health webcast series, in a discussion titled, "Leadership in the Next Steps on Health Reform," moderated by Dr. John McDonough.

Administrator of the Centers for Medicare and Medicaid Services

Nomination and controversy
On April 19, 2010, Berwick was nominated to be Administrator of the Centers for Medicare and Medicaid Services, which oversees the two federal programs.

Berwick said, "20 percent to 30 percent of health spending is 'waste' that yields no benefit to patients, and that some of the needless spending is a result of onerous, archaic regulations enforced by his agency." Berwick's critics have cited his statements about the need for health care to redistribute resources from the rich to the poor and his favorable statements about the British health service. They quote Berwick as saying, "The decision is not whether or not we will ration care—the decision is whether we will ration with our eyes open."

Berwick said Republicans had "distorted" his meaning when he said, "My point is that someone, like your health insurance company, is going to limit what you can get. That's the way it's set up. The government, unlike many private health insurance plans, is working in the daylight. That's a strength." For political reasons, the Obama administration didn't want Berwick to defend his past statements on the British health service, spending caps and high-technology care.

An editorial wrote that his policy ideas could cut health care costs. Conservatives criticized Berwick, based on comments he made about health care being, by definition, redistribution of wealth, rationing care with "our eyes open" and complete lives system.

Berwick advocated cutting health costs by adopting some of the approaches of Great Britain's National Health Services (NHS) and its National Institute for Health and Clinical Excellence (NICE). NICE evaluates the costs and effectiveness of medical therapy that is covered by the NHS as guidance for local authorities to decide what to cover. Mark McClellan, who served in the Bush administration, also advocated adopting some of NICE's methods.

Conservative critics claim, "NICE decides which healthcare people will get and which they won't." Philip Klein in The American Spectator dubbed him "Obama's Rationing Man". The chairman of NICE called these statements "outrageous lies".

Senator John Kerry defended Berwick against "phony assertions" and accused Republicans of trying "to crank up the attack machine and make his nomination a distorted referendum on reform". Former Speaker Newt Gingrich has historically been a Republican supporter of Berwick, however, writing an op-ed in The Washington Post in August 2000 praising Berwick's work.

Berwick was installed by recess appointment on July 7, 2010, before confirmation hearings were scheduled by the Democratic-controlled Senate committee. Berwick could thus serve until the summer of 2011 without a Senate approval. The White House had talked up the possibility of a re-nomination through the fall of 2010; on January 26, 2011, the President re-nominated Berwick. On March 4, 2011, 42 U.S. Senators wrote the White House and asked for the nomination to be withdrawn. The signers of the letter were all Republicans.

Resignation
Berwick resigned his position at CMS on December 2, 2011. In a speech on Wednesday, December 7, 2011, in Orlando, Florida, at a meeting of the Institute for Healthcare Improvement, an organization he once led, the long-time patient-safety advocate gave an account of his time in government service and where he believes the future of healthcare is going.

Work in the UK
Donald Berwick was the lead author of the Berwick Report, a seminal report into patient safety in England, following the Stafford Hospital scandal.

Berwick was knighted in 2005 for his work creating new care models in five trusts in the UK’s National Health Service—acute care hospitals, multi-specialty groups, accident emergency rooms, mental health, and nursing homes.

2014 Massachusetts gubernatorial election

On June 17, 2013, Berwick announced his run for the Massachusetts Governor's office. Berwick framed himself as progressive on major issues and said it was crucial that Massachusetts continue to focus on health care reform and the well-being of children, topics he has focused on during his career. Berwick, who holds three degrees from Harvard, repeatedly emphasized his experience in helping health organizations deliver better care to consumers, an asset he said he would bring to being the state’s chief executive.

Some of Berwick's specific goals for the governorship included focusing on job creation and economic development, instituting single-payer healthcare in Massachusetts, and ending child poverty in the state by the year 2024. Following the conviction of former probation commissioner John O'Brien on corruption charges, Berwick added that rooting out corruption would be another priority.

Although Berwick was seen as the heir to the Massachusetts trend of electing political outsiders to high offices, like Governor Deval Patrick and Senator Elizabeth Warren, pundits raised concerns in the Summer of 2014 that Berwick had failed to gain the traction he needed to succeed in the primary. However, he outperformed nearly all projections and pollsters in the Democratic primary with 21% of the vote, which prompted the recognition of him being a "surprise" in the race.

Berwick conceded the Democratic nomination to Massachusetts Attorney General Martha Coakley on September 9, 2014, who lost to Republican Charlie Baker at the general election.

Awards and honors
 Ernest A. Codman Award, 1999
 Alfred I. DuPont Award for excellence in children’s healthcare, 2001
 American Hospital Association, "Award of Honor", 2002
 Fellow of the Royal College of Physicians in London, 2004
 Honorary Knight Commander of the Most Excellent Order of the British Empire, 2005
 Purpose Prize for "enlisting wide-scale cooperation and scientifically-proven protocols to help hospitals improve care and save more than 100,000 lives", 2007
 The 13th Annual Heinz Award for Public Policy, 2007
 Honorary Fellowship of the Royal College of Physicians of Ireland, Dublin October 20, 2012
Membership to the American Philosophical Society, 2016

Selected bibliography

Books

Articles

.
.
.
 .
 .
.
.
.
 .
.
.
.
.
 .
 Berwick DM, Jain SH. "The Basis for Quality Care in Prepaid Group Practice", in Toward a 21st Century Health System: The Contributions and Promise of Prepaid Group Practice. Alain C. Enthoven & Laura A. Tollen eds. San Francisco: Jossey-Bass, 2004.
 .
 .
 .
 Berwick, DM, Jain SH, and Porter ME. "Clinical Registries: The Opportunity For The Nation". Health Affairs Blogs, May 2011.

References

External links

 Profiles in Leadership: Don Berwick
 Dr. Berwick at Harvard Medical School
 Donald Berwick at the Institute of Medicine of the National Academies

1946 births
American pediatricians
American public health doctors
Harvard College alumni
Harvard Medical School alumni
Harvard Medical School faculty
Honorary Knights Commander of the Order of the British Empire
Jewish American community activists
Harvard Kennedy School alumni
Living people
Massachusetts Democrats
Members of the American Philosophical Society
People from East Haddam, Connecticut
United States Department of Health and Human Services officials
Obama administration personnel
Members of the National Academy of Medicine